Whipple Lake is a lake in Clearwater County, Minnesota, in the United States.

Whipple Lake was named for Henry Benjamin Whipple, an Episcopal bishop who worked closely with Ojibwe and Sioux Indians.

See also
List of lakes in Minnesota

References

Lakes of Minnesota
Lakes of Clearwater County, Minnesota